Irving "Sully" Boyar (December 14, 1923 – March 23, 2001) was an American actor of Russian-Jewish descent.

Boyar was one of seven children, some of whom grew up to become lawyers and businessmen. He also worked as a lawyer before turning to acting.  He had a twin brother named Samuel.

A life member of the Actors Studio, he worked with Al Pacino in Dog Day Afternoon (1975) as the bank manager Mulvaney. His many other film credits included The Panic in Needle Park (1971), The King of Marvin Gardens (1972), The Gambler (1974), Car Wash (1976), The Deadliest Season (1977), Oliver's Story (1978), Night of the Juggler (1980), The Jazz Singer (1980), Fort Apache, The Bronx (1981), The Entity (1982), Too Scared to Scream (1985), Prizzi's Honor (1985), Best Seller (1987), The Lemon Sisters (1989), Betsy's Wedding (1990), In the Soup (1992), and Just the Ticket (1999). He was also a theater actor.

On television, he regularly appeared in the first 4 seasons of Law & Order, mostly in a cameo role as an arraignment judge. He also guest starred on The Sopranos, in 2001, playing Dr. Krakower, a psychiatrist consulting with Carmela Soprano. 
 
On March 23, 2001, while waiting for a city bus in Queens, New York, Sully Boyar died of a heart attack at 77.

Filmography

References

External links

American male film actors
American male television actors
American people of Russian-Jewish descent
Male actors from New York (state)
People from Williamsburg, Brooklyn
1923 births
2001 deaths
Burials at Kensico Cemetery
20th-century American male actors